The Yakushima macaque (Macaca fuscata yakui) is a subspecies of Japanese macaque that is indigenous to Yakushima Island (Kagoshima Prefecture). It is also known as the Yaku macaque.

Characteristics

Compared with M. f. fuscata which lives from Honshu to Shikoku and Kyushu, Japan, these individuals are smaller, stockier, have black hands and feet, and a thicker gray coat.

Adults have darker fur than infants and juveniles.
Adult males have a special feature called a “momoware” (split peach) which parts their hair in the center from right to left.

Females bear a single offspring between March and May, every two years.
Troop size is generally less than 50 individuals.

The Yakushima macaque population in Yakushima Island lies at the southern limit of Japanese macaque's distribution.  The current population is estimated to be somewhere between 9,500–19,000 animals, according to a survey completed in 1999.

Diet 
The food available for the monkeys are based on certain factors such as temperature and availability. Feeding on young leaves, seeds, and flowers was affected more by availability, while feeding on fruits, mature leaves, and fallen seeds was affected more by temperature. Feeding on insects is strongly correlated with temperature,perhaps because availability of insects increased with temperature.

Human interactions
In the past in Yakushima, when food supplies for macaques became short, the monkeys would encroach on human habitation and damage crops; 400–500 Yakushima macaques were caught and exterminated every year due to the damage done to the Ponkan and Tankan orange crops for which Yakushima is especially noted.

The reason may be because the monkeys' broadleaf tree habitat declined due to logging and replacement of the broadleaves with conifers.  Nowadays, Yakushima residents aim to coexist by protecting their crops with electric fences, rather than exterminating the macaques.

Protected status
According to the Ministry of the Environment's Red List of endangered species, the Yakushima macaque was judged “a rare species” in 1991 and “a quasi-endangered species” in 1998. But it was removed from the list in 2007 due to an increase in population.
A species of Japanese monkey also inhabited Tanegashima, an island near Yakushima, until the 1950s, when it became extinct. Whether those monkeys were Hondo macaques or Yakushima macaques is unknown.

References 

 阿部永監修、阿部永・石井信夫・伊藤徹魯・金子之史・前田喜四雄・三浦慎吾・米田政明著、財団法人自然環境研究センター編 『日本の哺乳類【改訂2版】』 東海大学出版会、2008年、66–67頁、。(Japanese)

External links
 Naohiko Noma　"Scientific value of the natural region of western Yakushima" Yakushima Open Field Museum Report 

Macaca
Endemic fauna of Japan
Primates of Asia
Mammals of Japan
Mammals described in 1941
Taxa named by Nagamichi Kuroda